Jivatram Bhagwandas Kripalani (11 November 1888 – 19 March 1982), popularly known as Acharya Kripalani, was an Indian politician, noted particularly for holding the presidency of the Indian National Congress during the transfer of power in 1947 and the husband of Sucheta Kripalani.
Kripalani was an environmentalist, mystic and independence activist who was long a Gandhian socialist, before joining the economically right wing Swatantra Party later in life.

He grew close to Gandhi and at one point, he was one of Gandhi's most ardent disciples. He had served as the General Secretary of the INC for almost a decade. He had experience working in the field of education and was made the president to rebuild the INC. Disputes between the party and the Government over procedural matters affected his relationship with the colleagues in the Government. Kripalani was a familiar figure to generations of dissenters, from the Non-Cooperation Movements of the 1920s to the Emergency of the 1970s.

Early life

Jivatram (also spelled Jiwatram) Bhagwandas Kripalani was born in Hyderabad in Sindh in 1888. Following his education at Fergusson College in Pune, he worked as a school teacher before joining the freedom movement in the wake of Gandhi's return from South Africa.
From 1912 to 1917 Kripalani worked as a lecturer of English and history at L.S. College (then known as Grier BB College), Muzaffarpur, Bihar.
Kripalani was involved in the Non-Cooperation Movement of the early 1920s. He worked in Gandhi's ashrams in Gujarat and Maharashtra on tasks of social reform and education, and later left for Bihar and the United Provinces in northern India to teach and organise new ashrams. He courted arrested on numerous occasions during the Civil Disobedience movements and smaller occasions of organising protests and publishing seditious material against the British Raj.

Congress leader
Kripalani joined the All India Congress Committee and became its general secretary in 1928–29.

Kripalani was prominently involved over a decade in top Congress party affairs, and in the organisation of the Salt Satyagraha and the Quit India Movement. Kripalani served in the interim government of India (1946–1947) and the Constituent Assembly of India. During this time he rejected the proposal of United Bengal from Abul Hashim and Sarat Bose and called for the division of Bengal and the Punjab.

He had served as the General Secretary of the INC for 12 years. He had experience working in the field of education and was made the president to rebuild the INC. Disputes between the party and the Government over procedural matters affected his relationship with the colleagues in the Government.

As Congress President and the election of 1950

In spite of being ideologically at odds with both Vallabhbhai Patel and Jawaharlal Nehru – he was elected Congress President for the crucial years around Indian independence in 1947. After Gandhi's assassination in January 1948, Nehru rejected his demand that the party's views should be sought in all decisions. Nehru, with the support of Patel, told Kripalani that while the party was entitled to lay down the broad principles and guidelines, it could not be granted a say in the government's day-to-day affairs. This precedent became central to the relationship between government and the ruling party in subsequent decades.

Nehru, however, supported Kripalani in the election of the Congress President in 1950. Kripalani, supported by Nehru, was defeated by Patel's candidate Purushottam Das Tandon. Bruised by his defeat, and disillusioned by what he viewed as the abandonment of the Gandhian ideal of a countless village republics, Kripalani left the Congress and became one of the founders of the Kisan Mazdoor Praja Party. This party subsequently merged with the Socialist Party of India to form the Praja Socialist Party.

For a while it was even believed that Nehru, stung by the defeat, was considering abandoning the Congress as well; his several offers of resignation at the time were all, however, shouted down. A great many of the more progressive elements of the party left in the months following the election. Congress's subsequent bias to the right was only balanced when Nehru obtained the resignation of Tandon in the run-up to the general elections of 1951.

1961 Candidacy

In October 1961, Kripalani contested the Lok Sabha seat of V. K. Krishna Menon, then serving as Minister of Defence, in a race that would come to attract extraordinary amounts of attention. The Sunday Standard observed of it that "no political campaign in India has ever been so bitter or so remarkable for the nuances it produced". Kripalani, who had previously endorsed Menon's foreign policy, devoted himself to attacking his vituperative opponent's personality, but ultimately lost the race, with Menon winning in a landslide.

Socialist Party
Kripalani remained in opposition for the rest of his life and was elected to the Lok Sabha in 1952 (lost General Election in February 1952 from Faizabad against Lallanji, UP, as KMPP candidate, but won a bye-election as PSP candidate from Bhagalpur), 1957 (from Sitamarhi, Bihar as PSP candidate), 1963, and 1967 (by-poll in Guna in MP as Swatantra Party candidate).  
His wife since 1938, Sucheta Kripalani, briefly joined KMPP founded by him in 1951, but later returned to Congress, and went from strength to strength in the Congress Party, with several Central ministries; she was also the first female Chief Minister, in Uttar Pradesh. When Congress split in 1969, Sucheta Kripalani became part of Congress (Org), led by Nijalingappa and Morarji Desai.

The Kripalanis were frequently at loggerheads in Parliament.

One matter they agreed on was the undesirability of vast parts of the Hindu Marriage Act, particularly the controversial 'Restitution of Conjugal Rights' clause. By this clause, a partner who had survived an unsuccessful filing for divorce could move the courts to return to the status quo ante in terms of conjugal interaction. Kripalani, horrified, made one of his most memorable speeches, saying "this provision is physically undesirable, morally unwanted and aesthetically disgusting."

Kripalani was also concerned with the privilege of parliament over the press. During Nehru's premiership, the Lok Sabha called the Chief Editor of the weekly Blitz, the well-known Russi Karanjia to the bar and admonished him for "denigration and defamation of a member of parliament" for calling Kripalani, "Cripple-loony". This was despite Karanjia's closeness to and Kripalani's estrangement from, Nehru.

Kripalani moved the first-ever No confidence motion on the floor of the Lok Sabha in August 1963, immediately after the disastrous India-China War.

Later life
Kripalani remained a critic of Nehru's policies and administration while working for social and environmental causes.

While remaining active in electoral politics, Kripalani gradually became more of a spiritual leader of the socialists than anything else; in particular, he was generally considered to be, along with Vinoba Bhave, the leader of what remained of the Gandhian faction. He was active, along with Bhave, in preservation and conservation activities throughout the 1970s.

In 1972-3, he agitated against the increasingly authoritarian rule of Nehru's daughter Indira Gandhi, then Prime Minister of India. Kripalani and Jayaprakash Narayan felt that Gandhi's rule had become dictatorial and anti-democratic. Her conviction on charges of using government machinery for her election campaign galvanised her political opposition and public disenchantment against her policies. Along with Jayaprakash Narayan, Kripalani toured the country urging non-violent protest and civil disobedience. When the Emergency was declared as a result of the vocal dissent he helped stir up, the octogenarian Kripalani was among the first of the Opposition leaders to be arrested on the night of 26 June 1975. He lived long enough to survive the Emergency and see the first non-Congress government since Independence following the Janata Party victory in the 1977 polls. He and Jayaprakash Narayan, two seniors guiding lights, were requested to choose the parliamentary leader of the new party who would be the prime minister, and they choose Morarji Desai. Jayaprakash Narayan, in wheel-chair, administered a pledge at Raj Ghat to new members of parliament that they will honour the mandate and remain united.

Acharya Kripalani died on 19 March 1982 at the Civil Hospital in Ahmedabad, at the age of 93.

In the 1982 film Gandhi by Richard Attenborough, J.B. Kripalani was played by Indian actor Anang Desai.

His autobiography My Times was released 22 years after his death by Rupa publishers in 2004.  In the book, he accused his fellow members of Congress (except Ram Manohar Lohia, Mahatma Gandhi, and Khan Abdul Gaffar Khan) of "moral cowardice" for accepting or submitting to plan to partition India.

A stamp was issued on 11 November 1989 by the Indian Postal Department to commemorate the 101st anniversary of his birth.

Trivia
Acharya Kripalani was born on the same day as Maulana Azad, who also was a prominent freedom fighter. Kripalani succeeded the latter as the President of the Indian National Congress at the Meerut session in 1946.

See also
 Indian Nationalism, Gandhism, Indian Independence Movement
 Indian National Congress, Indian Emergency

Biography
Ram Bahadur Rai, Shaswat Vidrohi Rajneta: Acharya J.B. Kripalani, National Book Trust, India, 2013.

References

Indian independence activists
Sindhi people
Presidents of the Indian National Congress
Janata Party politicians
1888 births
1982 deaths
Members of the Constituent Assembly of India
Prisoners and detainees of British India
India MPs 1952–1957
India MPs 1957–1962
India MPs 1962–1967
India MPs 1967–1970
Gandhians
Praja Socialist Party politicians
Lok Sabha members from Madhya Pradesh
Indians imprisoned during the Emergency (India)
Swatantra Party politicians